Reiek is a mountain and tourist spot 29 km from Aizawl, Mizoram, India. It rests at an elevation of 1,465 metres overlooking Aizawl and offers a view of the surrounding valleys and hills. On a clear day, the plains of Bangladesh can be seen from the top of the hill. Reiek Hill is surrounded by thick lush green temperate trees and bushes.

Geography 

Reiek Tiang is a cuesta (a hill with a gentle slope on one side  and a steep slope on the other) created by erosion of the tertiary sand shale alterations.

Culture

Heritage village

Reiek has a typical Mizo village consisting of the distinctive traditional huts of the different Mizo sub-tribes, Mizo chieftain’s house, a bachelor’s dormitory and that of a widow has been created and maintained by Tourism Department of Mizoram. The houses are fully furnished giving the visitor a peek into the glorious past of the valiant highlanders. A few Mizo modern houses have also been constructed nearby to show the changes that have taken place in the Mizo way of life in keeping pace with the modern developments. The Department also has a cafeteria and a resort providing decent food and accommodation. This is also the venue for the annual Anthurium festival (September) and the best time to visit would be in April.

Anthurium festival

Anthurium Festival is a festival promoting Anthurium grown in Mizoram and the rich Mizo customs and traditions at Reiek Tlang to tourists. The Anthurium Festival is organized every year by the Tourism Department and the Horticulture Department with financial support of the central government. It has a dual purpose — promoting the cultivation and marketing of the enthralling flower and attracting more tourists to the scenic beauties of Mizoram. The festival showcases the rich and rhythmic cultural dances and games of Mizoram. Fashion shows are also a regular feature of the festival.

Ecology

Fauna 

The forests in Reiek hills are home to a fascinating variety of hill birds, including the rare Peregrine falcon which one might see perched on a lofty ledge or swooping on cliff swallows. Right on top of the peak is a big boulder jutting out over a high precipice. The Environment & Forest Department has encouraged tourist to inform the local community before trekking in the forest of Reiek.

Flora

See also
Tourism in Mizoram

References

External links
Reiek Mizoram Tourism

Tourism in Northeast India
Tourist attractions in Mizoram
Tourism in Mizoram
Lushai Hills
Hills of Mizoram